Fluid Existential Inversions is the sixth studio album by American progressive metal band Intronaut. It was released February 28, 2020, through Metal Blade, their first release through the label and since leaving Century Media.

Track listing

Personnel
 Intronaut
 Sacha Dunable – guitar, vocals
 Joe Lester – bass
 Dave Timnick – guitar, vocals

Session musicians
 Alex Rüdinger - drums
 Ben Sharp - guitar on "The Cull" and "Sour Everythings"

 Production
 Josh Newell – producer, engineering
 Kurt Ballou – mixing

References 

2020 albums
Intronaut albums
Metal Blade Records albums